La Courneuve is a commune in Seine-Saint-Denis, France.

History

Inhabited since pre-Roman times, the area is thought to have been a small village up through the Middle Ages. With its proximity to Paris, it soon became a fashionable country destination, with a number of gentry residing there. It had two notable châteaux - Sainte-Foi and Poitronville.  Towards the end of Napoleon's reign, the entire area experienced large population growth. This along with improved methods of farming eventually transformed the area into the major legume producer for the Paris regional.

In 1863, the first major industrial enterprise was introduced and the area soon became a strange mix of factories and farmlands. Industrial estates were juxtaposed with bean plantations and that would continue until after World War II.

During the 1960s, as Paris could no longer meet the demands of a further exploding population (largely the result of immigration from former colonies), La Courneuve, like many other suburbs of Paris, was designated as one of the "zones à urbaniser en priorité" (areas to be urbanized quickly) and was built up at a very rapid pace, with the construction of large council estates and tower blocks and other HLM developments. Between 1962 and 1968 the population nearly doubled.

Heraldry

Demographics

Immigration

Education
Preschools and primary schools
 Anatole-France
 Charlie-Chaplin
 Irène-Joliot-Curie
 Louise-Michel
 Paul-Doumer
 Paul-Langevin / Henri-Wallon
 Robespierre / Jules-Vallès
 Saint-Exupéry
 Raymond-Poincaré 
 Rosenberg 
 Joséphine-Baker
 Angela Davis

High schools/junior high schools:
 Collège Raymond-Poincaré
 Collège Jean-Vilar
 Collège Georges-Politzer

Sixth-form colleges/senior high schools:
 Lycée Jacques-Brel
 Lycée d'enseignement professionnel Denis-Papin
 Lycée Arthur-Rimbaud

Transport
La Courneuve is served by La Courneuve – 8 Mai 1945 station on Paris Métro Line 7 and by La Courneuve – Aubervilliers station on Paris RER line B.

Notable people
 Haris Belkebla, Algerian footballer
Suzanne Masson, French resistance fighter, (1901-1943)
Dinos (rapper), French Rapper

See also
Communes of the Seine-Saint-Denis department
Stade de Marville
Centre des archives diplomatiques de La Courneuve

References

 Un peu d'histoire. 07 Feb. 2006. La Ville de La Courneuve
Mayol, Pierre. "The Policy of the City and Cultural Action". Canadian Journal of Communication Vol. 27, No. 2 (2002)
                          Van Renterghem, Marion. "La Courneuve, « Rebeus » et « Renois » disent la vie des « 4000 »." Le Monde, 1 July 2005

External links

 Official website
  

Communes of Seine-Saint-Denis